The 1933 Tour of Flanders was held on 2 April 1933.

General classification

Final general classification

References
Résultats sur siteducyclisme.net
Résultats sur cyclebase.nl

External links
 

Tour of Flanders
1933 in road cycling
1933 in Belgian sport